Tukal Mokalam (15 June 1949 – March 1975) was a Filipino sprinter. He competed in the men's 100 metres at the 1972 Summer Olympics.

References

External links
 

1949 births
1975 deaths
Athletes (track and field) at the 1972 Summer Olympics
Filipino male sprinters
Olympic track and field athletes of the Philippines
Sportspeople from Manila